The 2019 CFL Draft took place on May 2, 2019 at 8:00 pm ET and was broadcast on TSN and RDS. 73 players were chosen from among eligible players from Canadian universities, as well as Canadian players playing in the United States on NCAA or NAIA teams.

The draft was broadcast live on TSN and RDS for two hours and then switched to digital platforms on TSN.ca and TSN GO. Randy Ambrosie, the CFL commissioner, was at the TSN studios in Toronto to announce the first twenty picks.

Top prospects
Source: CFL Scouting Bureau rankings.

Trades
In the explanations below, (D) denotes trades that took place during the draft, while (PD) indicates trades completed pre-draft.

Round one
 BC → Winnipeg (PD). BC traded this selection and a second-round pick in the 2018 CFL Draft to Winnipeg in exchange for a first-round pick and a second-round pick in the 2018 CFL Draft.

Round two
 Montreal → Hamilton (PD). Montreal traded this selection and the first, 31st, and 44th overall selections in the 2018 CFL Draft to Hamilton in exchange for the second, 34th, and 56th overall picks in the 2018 CFL Draft, Ryan Bomben, and Jamal Robinson. 
 BC → Montreal (PD). BC traded this selection to Montreal in exchange for Tyrell Sutton and a third-round pick in this year's draft.
 Ottawa → Montreal (PD). Ottawa traded this selection to Montreal in exchange for Chris Ackie.

Round three
 Saskatchewan → Montreal (PD). Saskatchewan traded this selection, Tevaughn Campbell, and a third-round pick in the 2018 CFL Draft to Montreal for Vernon Adams and a fifth-round pick in the 2018 CFL Draft.
 Edmonton → Toronto (PD). Edmonton traded this selection to Toronto in exchange for Martese Jackson and a conditional sixth-round pick in the 2020 CFL Draft.
 Montreal → BC (PD). Montreal traded this selection and Tyrell Sutton to BC in exchange for a second-round pick in this year's draft.
 BC → Hamilton (PD).  BC traded this selection to Hamilton in exchange for a sixth-round pick in this year's draft and Davon Coleman. This was originally a fourth-round pick, but was revealed to be a third-round pick when the official draft order was released.

Round four
 Hamilton → Calgary (PD). Hamilton traded this selection and fourth-round pick in the 2018 CFL Draft to Calgary in exchange for Charleston Hughes and the 34th overall pick (fourth round) in the 2018 CFL Draft.

Round five
 Hamilton → Edmonton (PD). Hamilton traded this selection and a seventh-round pick in the 2018 CFL Draft to Edmonton in exchange for Shamawd Chambers.

Round six
 Hamilton → BC (PD). Hamilton traded this selection and Davon Coleman to BC in exchange for a fourth-round pick in this year's draft.

Round seven
 Saskatchewan → Toronto (PD). Saskatchewan traded this selection to Toronto in exchange for Brian Jones.

Round eight
 Toronto → Hamilton (PD). Toronto traded this selection to Hamilton in exchange for Abdul Kanneh.

Conditional trades
 Montreal → Winnipeg (PD). Montreal traded a conditional eighth-round selection to Winnipeg in exchange for Adarius Bowman. This condition was not fulfilled and Montreal kept the selection.

Territorial exemptions
Beginning in 2019, the CFL announced the two teams with the highest waiver priority will each get to make one Territorial Draft Pick (to be used to select a player born within their territorial limits at the end of the second round). The two teams that qualified for the 2019 Draft were Montreal and Toronto and these picks were made with the 17th and 18th overall picks.

This was the first time since 1984 that the league’s draft will feature territorial selections. From 1972 to 1982, each club had the right to pre-select two players from its region who would be exempted from the draft. That limit was reduced to one Draft exemption selection in 1983 and 1984, and then the practice was terminated altogether prior to the 1985 Canadian Draft.

Forfeitures
 Montreal forfeited their first round pick after selecting Tyler Johnstone in the 2018 Supplemental Draft.

Draft order

Round one

Round two

Round three

Round four

Round five

Round six

Round seven

Round eight

See also
2019 CFL–LFA Draft
2019 European CFL Draft

References

Canadian College Draft
2019 in Canadian football